Riz District is in Jam County, Bushehr province, Iran. At the 2006 census, its population was 9,464 in 2,097 households. The following census in 2011 counted 11,018 people in 2,762 households. At the latest census in 2016, the district had 12,973 inhabitants living in 3,608 households.

References 

Districts of Bushehr Province
Populated places in Jam County